Walter Herbert Leigh (November 1874 – 1938) was an English footballer active at the turn of the 20th century. He made a total of 119 appearances in The Football League for Aston Villa, Grimsby Town, Bristol City and Clapton Orient.

References

1874 births
English Football League players
Aston Villa F.C. players
Altrincham F.C. players
Grimsby Town F.C. players
Bristol City F.C. players
Gillingham F.C. players
Leyton Orient F.C. players
Hastings & St Leonards United F.C. players
English footballers
1938 deaths
Association football forwards